Stan Winfrey (born February 20, 1953) is a former American football running back. He played for the Miami Dolphins from 1975 to 1977 and for the Tampa Bay Buccaneers in 1977.

References

1953 births
Living people
American football running backs
Arkansas State Red Wolves football players
Miami Dolphins players
Tampa Bay Buccaneers players